Events in the year 1978 in Brazil.

Incumbents

Federal government
 President: General Ernesto Geisel 
 Vice President: 	General Adalberto Pereira dos Santos

Governors 
 Acre: vacant
 Alagoas: 
 until 14 August: Divaldo Suruagy  
 14 August-14 September: Ernandes Lopes Dorvillé
 from 14 September: Geraldo Mello
 Amazonas: Henoch da Silva Reis
 Bahia: Roberto Santos 
 Ceará: José Adauto Bezerra (until 28 February); Waldemar Alcântara (from 28 February)
 Espírito Santo: Élcio Álvares 
 Goiás: Irapuan Costa Jr. 
 Maranhão: Oswaldo da Costa Nunes Freire  
 Mato Grosso: Jose Garcia Neto then Cássio Leite de Barros 
 Mato Grosso do Sul: vacant
 Minas Gerais: Aureliano Chaves (until 9 July); Levindo Ozanan Coelho (from 9 July)
 Pará: Aloysio Chaves (until 1 August); Clóvis Rego (from 1 August)
 Paraíba: Ivan Bichara (until 14 August); Dorgival Terceiro Neto (from 14 August)
 Paraná: Jaime Canet Júnior 
 Pernambuco: Francisco Moura Cavalcanti 
 Piauí: Dirceu Arcoverde (until 14 August); Djalma Veloso (from 14 August)
 Rio de Janeiro: Floriano P. Faria Lima
 Rio Grande do Norte: Tarcisio de Vasconcelos Maia 
 Rio Grande do Sul: Sinval Sebastião Duarte Guazzelli 
 Santa Catarina: Antônio Carlos Konder Reis 
 São Paulo: Paulo Egídio Martins 
 Sergipe: José Rollemberg

Vice governors
 Acre: Omar Sabino de Paula 
 Alagoas: Antônio Guedes Amaral (from 14 September)
 Amazonas: João Bosco Ramos de Lima 
 Bahia: Edvaldo Brandão Correia 
 Ceará: José Waldemar de Alcântara e Silva (until 1 March); vacant thereafter (from 1 March)
 Espírito Santo: Carlos Alberto Lindenberg von Schilgen 
 Goiás: José Luís Bittencourt 
 Maranhão: José Duailibe Murad 
 Mato Grosso: Cássio Leite de Barros (until 14 August); vacant thereafter (from 14 August)
 Mato Grosso do Sul: vacant
 Minas Gerais: Levindo Ozanam Coelho (until 5 July); vacant thereafter (from 5 July)
 Pará: Clovis Silva de Morais Rego (until 1 August); vacant thereafter (from 1 August)
 Paraíba: Dorgival Terceiro Neto (until 14 August); vacant thereafter (from 14 August)
 Paraná: Octávio Cesário Pereira Júnior 
 Pernambuco: Paulo Gustavo de Araújo Cunha 
 Piauí: Djalma Martins Veloso (until 14 August); vacant thereafter (from 14 August)
 Rio de Janeiro: vacant
 Rio Grande do Norte: Geraldo Melo 
 Rio Grande do Sul: José Augusto Amaral de Sousa 
 Santa Catarina: Marcos Henrique Büechler 
 São Paulo: Ferreira Filho 
 Sergipe: Antônio Ribeiro Sotelo

Births 
January 29 – Joice Hasselmann, journalist, writer, activist and conservative political commentator
March 7 – Jaqueline Jesus, psychologist and activist
March 18 – Fernandão, Brazilian footballer and manager (d. 2014)
May 10 – Marcelo Moretto, footballer
May 30 – Lyoto Machida, mixed martial artist
June 23 – Leandro Firmino, actor
June 28 – Baiano, footballer
July 4 – Marcos Daniel, tennis player
July 17 – Ricardo Arona, mixed martial artist
July 20 – André Bankoff, actor
September 16 – Carolina Dieckmann, actress

Deaths

References

See also 
1978 in Brazilian football
1978 in Brazilian television

 
1970s in Brazil
Years of the 20th century in Brazil
Brazil
Brazil